Alakanuk Airport  is a state-owned public-use airport located  west of the central business district of Alakanuk, a city in the Kusilvak Census Area of the U.S. state of Alaska.

As per Federal Aviation Administration records, the airport had 4,015 passenger boardings (enplanements) in calendar year 2008, 3,302 enplanements in 2009, and 3,213 in 2010. It is included in the National Plan of Integrated Airport Systems for 2011–2015, which categorized it as a non-primary commercial service airport (between 2,500 and 10,000 enplanements per year).

Facilities 
Alakanuk Airport was moved to a new location in 2012; previously, it was located southwest of the town, at an elevation of 10 feet (3 m) above mean sea level. It had one runway designated 18/36 with a gravel and dirt surface measuring 2,200 by 55 feet (671 x 17 m).

Airlines and destinations 
The following airlines offer scheduled passenger service at this airport:

Prior to its bankruptcy and cessation of all operations, Ravn Alaska served the airport from multiple locations.

Statistics

References

External links 
 Alaska FAA airport diagram (GIF)
 Topographic map from USGS The National Map
 Resources for this airport:
 Airport information for AUK (PAUK) at FAA
 
 
 

Airports in the Kusilvak Census Area, Alaska